Collstrop was a Belgian professional road cycling team that existed from 1986 until 2000, when it merged into .

Final Roster (2000)

Major victories
 Omloop van het Houtland: Hendrik Redant (1987), Etienne De Wilde (1994)
 Kuurne–Brussels–Kuurne: Hendrik Redant (1988)
 Cholet-Pays de Loire: Laurent Desbiens (1992), Marc Bouillon (1993)
 Volta Limburg Classic: Erwin Thijs (1994), John van den Akker (1994)
 Grand Prix Guillaume Tell: Peter Verbeken (1993, 1995)
 Grand Prix de Denain: Jo Planckaert (1995)
 Nokere Koerse: Jo Planckaert (1995)
 Clásica de Almería: Jean-Pierre Heynderickx (1995)
 Stage 7 Vuelta a España: Benny Van Brabant (1990)

UCI Rankings

References

Cycling teams based in Belgium
Cycling teams established in 1986
Cycling teams disestablished in 2000
1986 establishments in Belgium
2000 disestablishments in Belgium